In narratology and comparative mythology, the Rank–Raglan mythotype (sometimes called the hero archetypes) is a set of narrative patterns proposed by psychoanalyst Otto Rank and later on amateur anthropologist Lord Raglan that lists different cross-cultural traits often found in the accounts of heroes, including mythical heroes.

Otto Rank developed his concept of the "Mythic Hero" in his 1909 text, The Myth of the Birth of the Hero that was based on Freudian ideas. It includes a set of 12 traits that are commonly found in hero myth narratives. Lord Raglan developed his concept of the "Mythic Hero" as an archetype, based on a ritualistic interpretation of myth, in his 1936 book, The Hero, A Study in Tradition, Myth and Drama. It is a set of 22 common traits that he said were shared by many heroes in various cultures, myths and religions throughout history and around the world. Raglan argued that the higher the score, the more likely the figure's biography is mythical. Raglan did not categorically deny the historicity of the Heroes he looked at, rather it was their common biographies he considered as nonhistorical.

The "Hero's Journey" (or monomyth) is a common story structure explored by anthropologists and mythologists. The concept of a standard narrative archetype of a monomythical "hero's quest" that was reputed to be pervasive across all cultures is controversial. The study of hero myths started in 1871 with anthropologist Edward Burnett Tylor's observations of common patterns in plots of hero's journeys. Later on, others introduced various theories on hero myths such Otto Rank and his Freudian psychoanalytic approach to myth, Lord Raglan's unification of myth and rituals, and eventually hero myth pattern studies were popularized by Joseph Campbell, who was influenced by Carl Jung's view of myth, in his 1949 work The Hero with a Thousand Faces. It illustrates several uniting themes of hero stories that hold similar ideas of what a hero represents, despite vastly different cultures and beliefs. The monomyth or Hero's Journey consists of three separate stages including the Departure, Initiation, and Return. Within these stages there are several archetypes that the hero or heroine may follow including the call to adventure (which they may initially refuse), supernatural aid, proceeding down a road of trials, achieving a realization about themselves (or an apotheosis), and attaining the freedom to live through their quest or journey.

These theories have been criticized by scholars as being very flawed and loose to the point that historical persons such as Abraham Lincoln would fit the mythotypes. Furthermore, "one should make obvious that many fictional non-royal figures will score low on the scale, while historical rulers will start off with a number of points automatically" which would lead to false mythotyping of historical persons.

History

Otto Rank
Otto Rank, in 1909, developed a Hero pattern that was very much based on Oedipus' legend, followed Freudian psychoanalytic thought in that the pattern lingered on the Hero's relations with the parents and was limited to the first half of the life of the Hero:

Lord Raglan
Lord Raglan, in 1936, developed a 22-point myth-ritualist Hero archetype to account for common patterns across Indo-European cultures for Hero traditions, following myth-ritualists like James Frazer and S. H. Hooke:

When Raglan's 22 point outline is used, a Hero's tradition is considered more likely to be mythical the more of these traits they hold (a point is added per trait). Raglan himself scored the following Heroes: Oedipus (21 or 22 points), Theseus (20 points), Romulus (18 points), Heracles (17 points), Perseus (18 points), Jason (15 points), Bellerophon (16 points), Pelops (13 points), Dionysos (19 points), Apollo (11 points), Zeus (15 points), Joseph (12 points), Moses (20 points), Elijah (9 points), Watu Gunung (18 points), Nyikang (14 points), Sigurd (11 points), Llew Llawgyffes (17 points), King Arthur (19 points), Robin Hood (13 points), and Alexander the Great (7 points).

Interpretation and criticism

Raglan and Rank

Folklorist Alan Dundes has noted that Raglan did not categorically deny the historicity of the Heroes he looked at, rather it was their common biographies he considered as nonhistorical. Furthermore, Dundes noted that Raglan himself had admitted that his choice of 22 incidents, as opposed to any other number of incidents, was arbitrarily chosen. Though Lord Raglan took stories about heroes as literal and even equated heroes with gods, Otto Rank took stories as symbolic.

Folklorist Francis Utley applied Raglan's list on definite historical people such as Abraham Lincoln. He states that the criteria are so flexible and arbitrary that Lincoln fit all of Lord Raglan's 22 points and that using Raglan's ideas would lead one to conclude that Lincoln was a mythical figure. In their criticism of the hero pattern, other historical figures that have been argued to fit the hero pattern quite well were John F. Kennedy, Winston Churchill, Napoleon and William Wallace, which bring into question its usability on historical matters.

Classicist Thomas J. Sienkewicz did other rankings of numerous Heroes and among those that scored quite high were actual historical persons like Tsar Nicholas II (14), Mithridates VI of Pontus, (22) Muhammad (17), and Buddha (15). Fictional characters such as Harry Potter (8) scored lower.

New Testament researcher James McGrath argues that fictional non-royal figures will score low on the scale and thus would be misclassified as "historical", while historical rulers will start off with a number of points automatically which would make them more likely to be misclassified as "mythical", for instance, Czar Nicholas II was historical and scored high and Harry Potter was clearly fictional and yet scored lower. Since the Rank and Raglan scales depend on the narratives about individuals, there is also an inherent problem in that sources will depict the same individual in a contradictory light as in the case of political figures who have supporters and opponents who wish to push contradictory narratives.

Hero's Journey (Monomyth)

According to Robert Segal, "The theories of Rank, Campbell, and Raglan typify the array of analyses of hero myths." For Otto Rank, the true subject of any hero myth was family relations, for Lord Raglan it was the physical world and the gods that controlled it, and for Joseph Campbell it was the mind. Both Rank and Campbell overlapped in views of myths as serving psychological functions and being primarily symbolic.

According to Northup (2006), mainstream scholarship of comparative mythology since Campbell has moved away from "highly general and universal" categories in general. This attitude is illustrated by e.g.  Consentino (1998), who remarks "It is just as important to stress differences as similarities, to avoid creating a (Joseph) Campbell soup of myths that loses all local flavor." 
 	
Similarly,  Ellwood (1999) stated "A tendency to think in generic terms of people, races ... is undoubtedly the profoundest flaw in mythological thinking."
 
Others have found the categories Campbell works with so vague as to be meaningless, and lacking the support required of scholarly argument:  Crespi (1990), writing in response to Campbell's filmed presentation of his model characterized it as "... unsatisfying from a social science perspective. Campbell's ethnocentrism will raise objections, and his analytic level is so abstract and devoid of ethnographic context that myth loses the very meanings supposed to be embedded in the 'hero.'" In Sacred Narrative: Readings in the Theory of Myth (1984), editor Alan Dundes  dismisses Campbell's work, characterizing him as a popularizer: "like most universalists, he is content to merely assert universality rather than bother to document it. […] If Campbell's generalizations about myth are not substantiated, why should students consider his work?"

References

External links
 Lord' Raglan's Hero Pattern, Monmouth College

Heroes in mythology and legend